Stenalia rufohumeralis is a beetle in the genus Stenalia of the family Mordellidae. It was described in 1926 by Píc.

References

rufohumeralis
Beetles described in 1926